Samuel Lewis may refer to:

Politics
 Samuel Lewis (politician) (1799–1854), American politician, Ohio Superintendent of Common Schools and Liberty Party candidate
 Samuel A. Lewis (1831–1913), American politician and philanthropist
 Samuel Lewis (barrister) (1843–1903), Sierra Leonean politician, lawyer, first African to be knighted
 Samuel S. Lewis (1874–1959), Secretary of the Pennsylvania Department of Forest and Waters in 1951–1954
 Sam Lewis (trade unionist) (1901–1976), Australian trade unionist
 Samuel W. Lewis (1930–2014), American diplomat
 Samuel W. Lewis (politician), American politician 
 Samuel Lewis Navarro (born 1957), Vice President of Panama

Other
 Samuel Lewis, early South Australian stonemason who carved the cross on William Light's first memorial
 Samuel Lewis (publisher) (c. 1782–1865), editor and publisher of topographical dictionaries and maps
 Samuel Lewis (financier) (1837–1901), English money-lender and philanthropist
 Samuel E. Lewis (1840–1907), Union Army soldier, Medal of Honor recipient
 Sam M. Lewis (1885–1959), American singer and lyricist
 Samuel L. Lewis (1896–1971), American Sufi founder, Zen educator
 Sam Lewis (rugby union, born 1990), Welsh rugby union player
 Sam Lewis (rugby union, born 1998), English rugby union player
 Sam Lewis (game designer), American designer of board games